Phatnotis is a genus of moth in the family Lecithoceridae.

Species
 Phatnotis factiosa Meyrick, 1913
 Phatnotis legata Meyrick, 1913

References

Natural History Museum Lepidoptera genus database

Lecithoceridae